This is a list of Academy Award winners and nominees from Germany.

Acting categories

Actor in a Leading Role

Actor in a Supporting Role

Actress in a Leading Role

Actress in a Supporting Role

Best Art Direction

Best Cinematography

Best Costume Design

Best Documentary

Documentary Feature

Short Documentary

Best Director

Best Editing

Best International Feature Film

Best Makeup and Hairstyling

Music categories

Best Original Score

Best Original Song

Best Picture

Best Short Film

Live Action

Animated

Best Sound Mixing

Best Visual Effects

Writing categories

Best Adapted Screenplay

Best Original Screenplay

Best Story (1928–1958)

Honorary Awards
This list focuses on German-born recipients of the Honorary Award

Nominations and Winners

See also

 Cinema of Germany
 List of German films

References

Lists of Academy Award winners and nominees by nationality or region
Academy Award winners and nominees
Academy Award winners and nominees
Academy Award winners and nominees